The 1st IAAF World Half Marathon Championships was held on September 19 and 20, 2001 in Tyneside, UK, and was run simultaneously with that year's Great North Run. A total of 204 athletes, 96 men, 84 women and 24 juniors, from 36 countries took part.
Complete results were published.

Though this competition was the first of its kind, it followed on from the 1991 IAAF World Women's Road Race Championships, which was held over the 15K distance.

Medallists

Results

Men's

Women's

Junior Men's

Team Results

Men's

Women's

Junior Men's (Boys)

Participation
The participation of 204 athletes (120 men/84 women) from 36 countries is reported.

 (5)
 (1)
 (2)
 (6)
 (3)
 (7)
 (4)
 (4)
 (5)
 (3)
 (13)
 (3)
 (10)
 (13)
 (5)
 (1)
 (9)
 (2)
 (13)
 (2)
 (9)
 (5)
 (3)
 (10)
 (7)
 (1)
 (1)
 (4)
 (13)
 (11)
 (4)
 (2)
 (2)
 (1)
 (10)
 (10)

See also
1992 in athletics (track and field)

References

External links
IAAF World Half Marathon Championships 1992-2005 Facts & Figures (Internet Archive)

IAAF World Half Marathon Championships
Half Marathon Championships
World Athletics Half Marathon Championships
International athletics competitions hosted by England